Evans is the remnant of a lunar impact crater that is located on the far side of the Moon. It lies to the south-southwest of the immense walled plain Hertzsprung, and is located within that impact basin's broad skirt of ejecta. This material has overflowed the northern rim of Evans and the northern part of the interior floor. The southern rim is not as heavily damaged, although it is irregular, eroded, and overlain by a pair of small craterlets. The most intact part of the rim is the southeastern section.

Satellite craters
By convention these features are identified on lunar maps by placing the letter on the side of the crater midpoint that is closest to Evans.

References

 
 
 
 
 
 
 
 
 
 
 
 

Impact craters on the Moon